Club Atlético Defensores Unidos (simply known as Defensores Unidos) is an Argentine football club from the Villa Fox district of Zárate, Buenos Aires. The team currently plays in Primera B, the regionalised third division of Argentine football league system.

Players

Current squad
.

Titles

Primera B (1): 2022
Primera C (2): 1993-94, 2017-18
Primera D (2): 1969, 2007-08

References

External links

Defensores (fan site)  
CADU  
CADU Blog (fan site)

Association football clubs established in 1914
Football clubs in Buenos Aires Province
1914 establishments in Argentina